The Cattaraugus Formation is a geologic formation in New York. It preserves fossils dating back to the Devonian period.

See also

 List of fossiliferous stratigraphic units in New York

References
 

Devonian geology of New York (state)
Devonian southern paleotemperate deposits